ACX may refer to:

 Audiobook Creation Exchange, an Audible.com audiobook service
 Atlantic City Expressway
 ACX Technologies, Inc, a holding company wholly owned by CoorsTek
Xingyi Wanfenglin Airport, China (IATA airport code ACX)
 Air Cargo Germany (ICAO airline code ACX, now defunct)
 Omani Arabic (ISO 639 language identifier acx)

See also